Justice Start may refer to:

Charles M. Start, chief justice of the Minnesota Supreme Court
Henry R. Start, associate justice of the Vermont Supreme Court